Worden (1949-1969) was a Thoroughbred racehorse foaled in France. Bred and raced by American expatriate Ralph Strassburger, Worden was raced in France, England, Italy and the United States.

Background
Worden's French-bed sire Wild Risk was successful in European flat racing as well as over jumps. At stud, Wild Risk was the Leading sire in France in 1961 and 1964. His progeny also included the very good runners Le Fabuleux, Prix du Jockey Club winner and the 1980 Leading Broodmare Sire in France bred and raced by Guy Weisweiller. Le Fabuleux would in turn sire the 1984 Canadian Horse of the Year, Dauphin Fabuleux. Wild Risk also sired Pierre Wertheimer's Vimy that won the 1955 King George VI and Queen Elizabeth Stakes and the Prix Noailles.

Racing career
Worden won stakes races in France and Italy, but his most important came in the United States at Laurel Park Racecourse where he won the 1953 edition of the Washington, D.C. International Stakes, forerunner of the Breeders' Cup. Among other performances in Worden's career, in England had run third to Epsom Derby winner Tulyar in the 1952 King George VI and Queen Elizabeth Stakes at Ascot and third again in the 1953 edition to Sir Victor Sasoon's colt Pinza. Before being shipped to the United States, on October 4th Worden ran third in the Prix de l'Arc de Triomphe at Longchamp to Paul Duboscq's winning filly La Sorellina.

At stud
As a stallion Worden stood for his owners at his birthplace, the Haras des Monceaux in Les Monceaux in Normandy. In 1959 he was the second Leading sire in France and third on the list in 1960 and 1961. Through his daughter's progeny Worden posthumously became the Leading broodmare sire in Great Britain and Ireland for 1975 and 1976.

Through his daughters, Worden was the damsire of:
1965 - Vent du Nord who won races in France and North America including the prestigious Canadian International Championship Stakes in 1969 under future U. S. Triple Crown winner, jockey Ron Turcotte
 1972 - Grundy, leading British two-year-old of 1974 and Timeform Top-rated Horse  in 1975. His career wins included the 1974 Dewhurst and Champagne Stakes, the  1975 Epsom Derby and Irish 2,000 Guineas
 1973 - La Mer (horse)La Mer, New Zealand horse of the year 1975, 1977
 1976 - Scintillate, winner of the 1979 Epsom Oaks 

Worden's other progeny included the stallion Trevieres who in turn sired the very good racemare, Tizna.

Pedigree

References

1949 racehorse births
1969 racehorse deaths
Thoroughbred racehorses
Racehorses bred in France
Racehorses trained in France
French racehorses